The Hinton Formation is a geologic formation in West Virginia. It preserves fossils dating back to the Carboniferous period. It is mainly made up of limestone, sandstone, and shale.

See also

 List of fossiliferous stratigraphic units in West Virginia

References
 
 "West Virginia Geology: Earth Science Studies." Accessed May 16, 2017.

Carboniferous West Virginia
Carboniferous geology of Virginia
Carboniferous southern paleotropical deposits
Serpukhovian